Seo Cho-won (서초원; born September 6, 1995) is a South Korean actress and model. She is best known for supporting roles in dramas. She has appeared in the school series Who Are You: School 2015 as Cho-won.

Filmography

Television

References

External links 
 

1995 births
Living people
21st-century South Korean actresses
South Korean female models
South Korean television actresses